Aníbal Quijano (17 November 1930 – 31 May 2018) was a Peruvian sociologist and humanist thinker, known for having developed the concepts of "coloniality of power" and "coloniality of knowledge". His body of work has been influential in the fields of decolonial studies and critical theory.

Education and academic career
Quijano received a Bachelor's degree from the National University of San Marcos (UNMSM), where he enrolled in various courses on Latin American history, anthropology, sociology and law. He later obtained a Master's degree at the Latin American Social Sciences Institute (FLACSO) in Santiago de Chile. He subsequently returned to Lima to study for a PhD at the University of San Marcos, which he completed in 1964. His PhD examined the emergence of rural-to-urban indigenous migrants in Peru and the changing roles and contexts of ethnic identity in Latin America. Until 1995, he was senior lecturer at the Faculty of Social Sciences of San Marcos. He was most recently a professor of the Department of Sociology at Binghamton University, New York. Quijano held several positions as a visiting professor in the social sciences at universities worldwide: Maison des Sciences de l'Homme (Paris), University of São Paulo, University of Puerto Rico, University of Hannover, Free University of Berlin, National University of Ecuador, National Autonomous University of Mexico (UNAM), Universidad de Chile, Latin American School of Economics (ESCOLATINA), and George Washington University. He wrote numerous books and publications on colonialism, politics, democracy, globalization and other social issues.

Works
1965: La emergencia del grupo cholo y sus implicaciones en la sociedad peruana, Ph.D. diss., Universidad de San Marcos, Lima.
1965: El movimiento campesino peruano y sus líderes, América Latina, year 8, no.4 (Oct–Dec).
1967: Tendencies in Peruvian Development and in the Class Struggle. In James Petras and Maurice Zeitlin, eds Latin America: Reform Or Revolution. New York: Fawcett.
1967: Contemporary Peasant Movements,. In Elites in Latin America, ed. S. Lipset and A. Solari. New York: Oxford University Press, pp. 301–342.
1969: (with Antonio García) Il Nuovo Marxismo Latinoamericano. A Cura de Giancarlo Santarelli. Milan: Feltrinelli.
1969: Urbanisation, Changement Social et Dependance. Dependance Et Developpement En Amerique Latine. Paris: Anthropos.
1969: Urbanization of Society in Latin America. Urbanization in Latin America. New York: Anchor Books.
1970: La Formation du Monde de la Marginalite Urbaine. Espaces et Societes, No. 1, Paris.
1971: Nationalism and Capitalism in Perú: a study in neo-imperialism. New York: Monthly Review Press.
1973: (with Francisco Weffort ) Die agrarreform in Perú. Gewalt und Ausbeutung. Lateinamerikas Landwirtschaft. Hamburg: Hoffman und Campe
1974: Crisis Imperialista y clase obrera en America Latina. Lima
1974: Perú: from the conciliation to the confrontation in Latin America and United States, Changing Political Relations. Stanford: Stanford University Press.
1974: Marginal Pole and Marginal Labor Force in Latin America. Economy and Society, London: Routledge, No. 1, 1974
1976: Crise Imperialista e Classe Operaria Na America Latina. Coimbra: Centelha.
1976: Tendencies of the Working Class. Latin American Perspectives, Issue 8, vol. III, No. 1. Berkeley.
1978: Imperialismo, clases sociales y estado en el Perú, 1890–1930: El Perú en la crisis de los años 30, Mosca Azul Ed. 136p.
1980: Caractère et Perspective de l’actuel régime militaire au Perou. Michael Löwy's Le Marxisme En Amerique Latine de 1909 a Nos Jours: Une Anthologie. Paris
1986: Die Enterstehung einer Marginalen Welt in den Latein Amerikanischen Stadten. Soziale Bewegungen und Raumliche Strukturen In Latein Amerika. Kassel: Gesamthochschulbibliothek.
1989: Identidad y Utopía en América Latina. Quito: Ediciones El Conejo.
1989: The paradoxes of modernity. International Journal of Politics, Culture and Society. Vol. 3, No. 2. New York: Winter.
1991: Colonialidad y Modernidad/Racionalidad. Perú Indígena, vol. 13, No. 29, pp. 11–20. Lima: Instituto Indigenista Peruano
1992: (with Immanuel Wallerstein) Americanity as a concept. Or The Americas in the Modern World-System. In International Social Science Journal, No. 134, Nov. 1992, UNESCO, Paris.
1994: Colonialité du Pouvoir et Democratie en Amerique Latine. Future Anterieur: Amérique Latine, Democratie Et Exclusion. Paris: L'Harmattan.
1995: El Fujimorismo y el Peru, Seminario de Estudios y Debates Socialistas. Lima, 48p.
1998: Work in a turning point?. In ISA Bulletin 75–76, Spring. Madrid: Universidad Complutense.
1998: Colonialidad, Poder, Cultura y Conocimiento en América Latina. In Anuario Mariateguiano, vol. IX, No. 9, pp..113–122. Lima: Amauta.
1999: Coloniality and Modernity/Rationality. In Goran Therborn, ed. Globalizations and Modernities. Stockholm: FRN.
2000: Colonialidad y Clasificación Social. Journal of World Systems Research, vol. VI, No. 2, Fall/Winter, pp. 342–388. Giovanni Arrighi and Walter L. Goldfrank, eds. Colorado.
2000: Coloniality of Power, Eurocentrism and Latin America. Nepantla, No. 3, Durham, North Carolina: Duke University Press.
2002: The Return of the Future and Questions about Knowledge. Current Sociology, vol. 50. Thousand Oaks, London: SAGE Publications, New Delhi.
2006. Estado-nación y movimientos indígenas en la región Andina: cuestiones abiertas. En OSAL, Observatorio Social de America Latina, año VI, no. 19. CLACSO, Consejo Latinoamericano de Ciencias Sociales, Buenos Aires. Julio.
2007: 'Colonialidad y clasificación social'. En: Santiago Castro-Gómez y Ramón Grosfoguel (eds). El giro decolonial. Reflexiones para una diversidad epistémica más allá del capitalismo global. Bogotá: Siglo del Hombre Editores.
2010: 'Coloniality and Modernity/Rationality', Chapter 2, pp. 22 – 32, in Globalization and the Decolonial Option, ed. by Walter Mignolo & Árturo Escobar, Routledge, London & New York.
2010: Die Paradoxien der eurozentrierten kolonialen Moderne, in Prokla – Zeitschrift für kritische Sozialwissenschaft 40 (1), Heft 158, 29–47.

See also
Dependency theory
World system theory

References 

1930 births
2018 deaths
Peruvian sociologists
Peruvian humanists
Critical theorists
Postcolonial theorists
Binghamton University faculty
National University of San Marcos alumni
Academic staff of the National University of San Marcos